The Greek Athletics Championships is an annual outdoor track and field competition organised by the Hellenic Amateur Athletic Association, which serves as the national championship for the sport in Greece.

The event was first held in 1896 and events for women were added to the schedule in 1930. The men's and women's championships have been organised both as separate competitions, and at the same venue.  Separate annual championship events are held for road running and racewalking events. There is also a Greek Indoor Athletics Championships.

Events
The competition programme features a total of 38 individual Greek Championship athletics events, 19 for men and 19 for women. For each of the sexes, there are seven track running events, three obstacle events, four jumps, four throws, and one combined track and field event.

Track running
100 metres, 200 metres, 400 metres, 800 metres, 1500 metres, 5000 metres, 10,000 metres
Obstacle events
100 metres hurdles (women only), 110 metres hurdles (men only), 400 metres hurdles, 3000 metres steeplechase
Jumping events
Pole vault, high jump, long jump, triple jump
Throwing events
Shot put, discus throw, javelin throw, hammer throw
Combined events
Decathlon (men only), Heptathlon (women only)

The women's programme gradually expanded to match the men's. On the track, the 1500 m was added in 1969, the 3000 metres in 1977 and the 10,000 metres in 1988. The 3000 m was replaced by the international standard 5000 m in 1995. Similarly, the women's pentathlon was replaced by the heptathlon in 1982. The 80 metres hurdles was contested until 1968, after which the international standard distance of 100 m hurdles was used. A 400 m hurdles event was introduced in 1976.  The women's field events reached parity with the men's after the addition of triple jump in 1992, and hammer throw and pole vault in 1995. From the period 1986–98 women had a 10,000 metres race walking championship. The women's steeplechase was the last event to be added to the schedule, with women first competing in a national championship event in 2001.

References

 
Athletics competitions in Greece
National athletics competitions
Recurring sporting events established in 1896
1896 establishments in Greece
Athletics